Flavia is an Ancient Roman name meaning “blonde” from the Latin word “flavus”, meaning “golden, blonde”. It is a feminine form of the Roman family name Flavius. The name is most commonly used in Italy, Romania, Brazil (Portuguese: Flávia) and in Spanish-speaking countries. It is in occasional use in the United States, where 12 newborn girls were given the name in 2021.

The Portuguese spelling of the name is Flávia.

Flavia is the name of Roman Catholic and Eastern Orthodox saints: Flavia Domitilla, Flavia Domitilla and Flavia. It was also the name of Princess Flavia, a major character in Anthony Hope's 1894 novel The Prisoner of Zenda and its sequel Rupert of Hentzau. It is also the name of Flavia de Luce, the 11-year-old sleuth who stars in Alan Bradley's mystery series that began with The Sweetness at the Bottom of the Pie in 2009.

Notable people
 Women of the gens Flavia
 Flavia Arcaro (1876–1937), American actress
 Flavia Bujor (born 1988), Romanian-born French novelist
 Flavia Cacace (born 1980), Italian dancer
 Flavia Eberhard (born 1976), Brazilian free-diver
 Flavia Fortunato (born 1964), Italian singer, actress and television presenter
 Flávia de Oliveira (born 1983), Brazilian model
 Flavia Pansieri (born 1951), Italian former United Nations Deputy High Commissioner for Human Rights, Assistant Secretary-General 
 Flavia Pennetta (born 1982), Italian tennis player 
 Flávia Saraiva (born 1999), Brazilian artistic gymnast
 Flavia Schwarz (born 1986), Swiss footballer
 Flavia Tartaglini (born 1985), Italian sport sailor   
 Flavia Tumusiime (born 1989), Ugandan actress, model, radio and television personality
 Flavia Vento (born 1977), Italian model, actress and television presenter

Fictional characters
 Flavia Gemina, a character in The Roman Mysteries
 Flavia de Luce, a character in the Alan Bradley mystery series
Flavia, a character from the Latin textbook Ecce Romani

Buildings 
 Porto Flavia

Notes

Italian feminine given names
Romanian feminine given names
Spanish feminine given names
Ancient Roman names